Alice Bel Colle is a comune (municipality) in the Province of Alessandria in the Italian region Piedmont, located about  southeast of Turin and about  southwest of Alessandria.

Alice Bel Colle borders the following municipalities: Acqui Terme, Cassine, Castel Rocchero, Castelletto Molina, Fontanile, Maranzana, Quaranti, and Ricaldone. The economy is mostly based on agriculture, including production of wine. It was a possession of the Marquisses of Montferrat until 1533.

References

External links
 Official website
 Acquese Web Portal - Alice Bel Colle in Italian

Cities and towns in Piedmont